Motorsport Games is an American video game developer, publisher and esports event organizer based in Miami, Florida. Motorsport Games is part of the Motorsport Network.

History 

Motorsport Games was founded in 2018 and on August 14, 2018, Motorsport Games acquired 53.5% equity interest in 704Games, as a result, Motorsport Games became the official developer and publisher of the NASCAR video game racing franchise. In the same month, Motorsport Games collaborated with Automobile Club de l'Ouest (ACO) to launch the Le Mans esports series competition.

In September 2019, Motorsport Games released the NASCAR Heat 4 game. In May 2020, 704 Games replaced Monster Games as developer for NASCAR Heat 5, which was released on July 10, 2020.

In March 2021 the company announced that it was acquiring Studio 397 and its rFactor 2 sim racing platform. In March 2022 it was announced that rFactor2 had been appointed the official sim racing platform of the all-electric FIA Formula E championship.

In August 2021 Motorsport Games announced that former President of EA Sports and former CEO of Liverpool Football Club Peter Moore had joined the Board.

2020 esports events
In 2020, during the COVID-19 Pandemic Motorsport Games produced several official esports events for NASCAR, 24 Hours of Le Mans, FIA Formula E World Championship and FIA World Rallycross Championship, eNASCAR Heat Pro League and Virtual Race of Champions.

In March 2020, Motorsport Games collaborated with Codemasters and Monster Energy, the sponsor of the FIA World Rallycross Championship, to create the World RX Esports Invitational which was held in April 2020.

In June 2020, Motorsport Games, the Automobile Club de l'Ouest and the FIA World Endurance Championship organized the 24 Hours of Le Mans Virtual race on the rFactor 2 gaming platform as a placeholder for the 2020 24 Hours of Le Mans which has been postponed from June to September 2020 as a result of the impact of the COVID-19 pandemic in France. It was watched by 14.2 million television viewers and reached 8.6 million views, and was the recipient of several awards such as Autosport Pioneering and Engineering Award at the Autosport Awards.

IPO and 2021 acquisitions
Motorsport Games completed its Initial public offering (IPO) in January 2021, ended up raising $69 million which was used for acquiring the remaining equity interest of 704 Games, and for acquiring KartKraft and Studio 397.

In February 2021, Motorsport Games announced that it has entered into an agreement to acquire game assets and code of PC kart racing simulator, KartKraft from Black Delta for an undisclosed amount with an aim to form a new studio called Motorsport Games Australia where the development of KartKraft will continue, and completed the deal in March 2021. On March 3, 2021, Motorsport entered into an agreement with Luminis International to acquire Studio 397 the developer of rFactor 2 which was completed two months later.

In July 2021, Motorsport Games announced that it will combine the Unreal graphics engine and the rFactor physics technology for developing NASCAR 21: Ignition which was released on October 26, 2021. The combination of the rFactor and Unreal engines will also be used for all the upcoming titles produced by Motorsport Games, like the British Touring Car Championship game due in 2022. In the same month, Motorsport Games entered into a license with IndyCar to develop both IndyCar video game series, with a planned launch date in 2023, and events. Also in June 2021, Motorsport Games announced the development of a dedicated video game title for the 24 Hours of Le Mans through a licensing deal with that race's parent organizations, the Automobile Club de l'Ouest and the FIA World Endurance Championship, due in 2023.

As of November 2022, the BTCC game originally scheduled to have been released in 2022 was officially delayed to a 2024 release.

On December 9th, 2022, Motorsport Games announced an equity purchase agreement with NYC-based Alumni Capital in the amount of up to $2 million in company stock, with options up to a total of $10 million expiring December 31st, 2023.

Controversies 

On March 28th, 2022, U.S. federal judge Stephanos Bibas accepted a motion by investors Innovate 2 Corp., Continental General Insurance Company, and Leo Capital Holdings LLC to sue Motorsport Games in the United States District Court for the District of Delaware. In the filing, the investors accuse four Motorsport Games executives of securities fraud, claiming that the executives provided misleading statistics to the remaining investors of 704Games about the company's financial situation and the sales performance of its main product, the NASCAR Heat franchise. The investors allege that the information they received allowed Motorsport Games to buy out the remaining shares of 704Games at a significant discount to what Motorsport Games offered at their IPO, at which point the NASCAR Heat series accounted for a majority of Motorsport Games' total net revenue, estimated at 99%. 

In November 2022, Motorsport Games received a notice of non-compliance with Nasdaq listing rules after its board of directors resigned over funding disputes. The company reported losses of $7.5 million against revenue of $1.2 million in the third quarter of 2022.

In January 2023, Motorsport Games organised the fourth annual Le Mans virtual 24-hour endurance race, a parallel to the real-life 24 Hours of Le Mans event. The race took place in Motorsport Games' sim racing video game rFactor 2 and featured notable motorsport drivers such as then-F1 World Champion Max Verstappen and Romain Grosjean. The event was plagued with server issues and disconnects and featured a lot of backlash from participants. Verstappen described the event as a "clown show" and online content creator and participant Jimmy Broadbent stated that this would ultimately "damage sim racing" as a medium. Several days after the event, an anonymous employee threatened to publicly leak the source code for NASCAR Heat 5, NASCAR 21: Ignition, KartKraft, and the unreleased IndyCar game unless unpaid wage payments were made.

Games 
 NASCAR Heat 5
 NASCAR 21: Ignition
 KartKraft
 rFactor 2

References

External links 
 Official website

Companies based in Miami
Motorsport
Companies listed on the Nasdaq
American companies established in 2017
Video game companies established in 2017
Video game companies of the United States
Video game development companies
Video game publishers